Daniel Thomas McVeigh (born 7 May 1930) is a former Australian politician. He served in the House of Representatives from 1972 to 1988, representing the National Party (previously the National Country Party). He held ministerial office in the Fraser Government, serving as Minister for Housing and Construction (1980–1982) and Minister for Home Affairs and the Environment (1982–1983).

Early life
McVeigh was born on 7 May 1930 in Allora, Queensland. In 1941, aged 11, he was tasked with welcoming Prime Minister Arthur Fadden to his school and promised to succeed him in the seat of Darling Downs. McVeigh later attended boarding school in Brisbane. He also played in the A-grade of the Darling Downs Rugby Union as a half-back. He served on the council of the Queensland Graingrowers' Association (1963–1966), as a Queensland delegate to the Australian Wheatgrowers' Federation (1964–1966), and on the Queensland State Wheat Board (1965–1974).

Politics
McVeigh won the seat of Darling Downs for the National Country Party at the 1972 election. He was appointed Minister for Housing and Construction in the Fraser government in November 1980. In May 1982, he was moved to the portfolio of Minister for Home Affairs and the Environment and held that position to the defeat of the government at the 1983 election. In 1984, with the abolition of the seat of Darling Downs, McVeigh followed most of his constituents into the new Division of Groom, which he held until his resignation in February 1988.

McVeigh aligned himself with Queensland premier Joh Bjelke-Petersen's "Joh for Canberra" campaign in 1987, which sparked a fracture in the Nationals between Queensland MPs seeking an independent National Party and supporters of federal leader Ian Sinclair and the existing coalition with the Liberals. He was the first Nationals MP to withdraw from the Coalition, doing so at a party meeting on 17 March. McVeigh nonetheless remained a Nationals frontbencher during this time, serving as the party's spokesman on Aboriginal affairs. He eventually rejoined the Coalition on 11 August.

In December 1987, it was reported that the Queensland state government had nominated McVeigh to serve as agent-general in London. He formally resigned from parliament on 29 February 1988, sparking a by-election in Groom.

Family
His son, John, served in the Queensland Legislative Assembly for Toowoomba South from 2012 to 2016 before winning Tom's old federal seat of Groom in 2016.

Notes

National Party of Australia members of the Parliament of Australia
Members of the Australian House of Representatives for Darling Downs
Members of the Australian House of Representatives for Groom
Members of the Australian House of Representatives
1930 births
Living people
People from Toowoomba
20th-century Australian politicians